Cisy  is a village in the administrative district of Gmina Narew, within Hajnówka County, Podlaskie Voivodeship, in north-eastern Poland.

The village has a population of 20. The most famous family to have originated from here are the Szelemej's. Founded by an unknown patriarchal Szelemej from Liski; Ivan, Dmytro, Hryhory, Ihor, and Pavlo Szelemej are the successors of the dynasty. Having been displaced after Operation Wisla initially, their legacy now continues in Winnipeg, Canada.

References

Cisy